The 2004 Oklahoma Republican presidential primary was held on February 3 in the U.S. state of Oklahoma as one of the Republican Party's statewide nomination contests ahead of the 2004 presidential election. Incumbent President George W. Bush easily won the primary with 90% of the vote against his only opponent on the ballot, Bill Wyatt, who unexpectedly won 10% of the vote.

Results

See also
 2004 Oklahoma Democratic presidential primary
 2004 Republican Party presidential primaries

References

Oklahoma
Republican presidential primary
Oklahoma Republican primaries